Leo Vincent Gordon (December 2, 1922 – December 26, 2000) was an American character actor and screenwriter. During more than 40 years in film and television he was most frequently cast as a supporting actor playing brutish bad guys but occasionally played more sympathetic roles just as effectively.

Early life and career
Gordon was born in Brooklyn in New York City on December 2, 1922. Reared by his father in dire poverty, Gordon grew up during the Great Depression. He left school in the eighth grade, went to work in construction and demolition, and then joined the New Deal agency, the Civilian Conservation Corps, in which he participated in various public works projects. After the United States entered World War II in 1941, Gordon enlisted in the U.S. Army, in which he served for two years and received an honorable discharge. Gordon was in southern California where he and a cohort attempted to rob a bar and its patrons with a pistol. He was shot in the stomach by one of the officers making the arrest. Convicted of armed robbery, he served five years in San Quentin Prison, where he furthered his education by reading nearly every book in the library.

Gordon took advantage of the benefits accorded him as part of the G.I. Bill and began taking acting lessons at the American Academy of Dramatic Arts (ADA). During his time at the ADA, Gordon was enrolled with several future screen legends including Grace Kelly and Anne Bancroft. For a time, Jason Robards, later a two-time Academy Award winner, was Gordon's instructor. It was there where he also met his future wife, Lynn Cartwright, who would have a sporadic but lengthy career as a character actor, mainly in television (though her most famous role came in the 1992 movie A League Of Their Own when she played Geena Davis's aging character "Dottie Hinson"). They were married in 1950 and remained together until his death a half century later. They had one child, a daughter named Tara.

Actor in film and television
Gordon started his career on the stage and worked with fellow actors Edward G. Robinson and Tyrone Power. He was soon discovered by a Hollywood agent in a Los Angeles production of Darkness at Noon. Over the course of his career Gordon would appear in more than 170 film and television productions from the early 1950s to the mid-1990s.

In 1954 Gordon portrayed the outlaw Bill Doolin, a native Arkansan who founded the Wild Bunch gang and operated primarily in Kansas, on the syndicated television series Stories of the Century, starring and narrated by Jim Davis.

In 1955 he was cast on the ABC religion anthology series Crossroads in the role of Sergeant Leroy in "All My Love". In 1958 he appeared as Joe Brock in the episode "Desert Fury" of CBS's Tales of the Texas Rangers. That same year Gordon was cast as Zip Wyatt in "Three Wanted Men" of Rex Allen's syndicated Western series Frontier Doctor. He also played a gunslinging professional killer in the pilot for the television version of Gunsmoke; but many changes were later instituted on the series, such as the marshal's office and Long Branch Saloon looking markedly different and the relationship between Matt Dillon and Kitty being subtly more formal as well, so the episode was buried deep in the season in the hope that viewers would not notice, which apparently worked.  This pilot likely was S1E26's “Hack Prine”.

Gordon was often cast to make the most of his  height, intense features, deep menacing voice, and icy stare. He had radiant light blue eyes. One of his earliest films was Riot in Cell Block 11, shot at Folsom prison. The film's director, Don Siegel, who worked with such screen tough guys as Clint Eastwood and John Wayne, related that "Leo Gordon was the scariest man I have ever met."

Other notable roles included that of John Dillinger in Siegel's Baby Face Nelson, opposite Mickey Rooney as the crazed protagonist. Gordon may be most noted for his recurring Irish character Big Mike McComb on the ABC/Warner Brothers Western television series Maverick, working from 1957 to 1960 alongside James Garner and Jack Kelly. Gordon's five appearances in the role include the much remembered episode "Shady Deal at Sunny Acres", "According to Hoyle" and "Plunder of Paradise" as well as "War of the Silver Kings", the first installment broadcast. Garner later recalled in his videotaped interview for the Archive of American Television that Gordon purposely punched him for real in one of their first scenes together and that Garner hit him back when filming the next scene. This is obviously visible when Gordon first hits Garner in the stomach, slamming Garner back against a closet door. Garner and Gordon reunited in the 1970s when Gordon appeared as a dimwitted bodyguard on four episodes of NBC's The Rockford Files starring Garner.

Gordon appeared in multiple roles on Robert Stack's 1959 ABC crime drama The Untouchables. Gordon also guest-starred on the ABC/WB western series The Alaskans opposite Roger Moore. He was cast as Damian in the 1961 episode "Million Dollar Suit" of the ABC/WB crime drama The Roaring 20s. He also appeared on the NBC Western series Empire and Laredo.

One of Gordon's best-remembered television appearances was on CBS's The Andy Griffith Show in the episode "High Noon in Mayberry", in which he portrays an ex-convict who appears destined for revenge against Sheriff Andy Taylor of fictitious Mayberry. The screenwriters for the episode, Jim Fritzell and Everett Greenbaum, borrowed heavily from Gordon's brief criminal career and subsequent incarceration in order to supplement the role.

Perhaps Gordon's single most memorable film scene occurred in McLintock! (1963), during which John Wayne knocks him down a long mudslide after uttering the famous line "Somebody oughta belt you in the mouth. But I won't! I won't! The hell I won't." Another notable role was in the 1966 western The Night of the Grizzly opposite Clint Walker, one of the very few actors who could match Gordon's intense screen presence regarding physical size and strength. Gordon played bounty hunter Cass Dowdy, who had a soft spot for his enemy's son but would, as one character said, "...hunt anything for a price, man or animal." Somehow, Gordon managed to make his character as sympathetic as he was frightening, and in his final scene he gives his life to save the boy.

Gordon portrayed sympathetic parts when called upon to do so, including his performances in the Western Black Patch (1957), a film that he wrote, and in Roger Corman's civil rights drama The Intruder (1962), opposite a young William Shatner.

In 1965, he was cast as the troublemaker Bender in the syndicated western series Death Valley Days in the episode "No Gun Behind His Badge", a dramatization of the Abilene, Kansas, marshal Thomas J. Smith, depicted in the segment by series host (and future U.S. President) Ronald Reagan. The episode also starred Michael Witney as Wild Bill Hickok, who succeeded Smith as marshal. In 1970 Gordon appeared as Loma Bartender on The Men From Shiloh (rebranded name for The Virginian) on the episode titled "Hannah."

Gordon also appeared as aging wrestler Milo Stavroupolis on NBC's Little House on the Prairie, starring Michael Landon.

Gordon's final role was as Wyatt Earp in a 1994 episode of the television series The Young Indiana Jones Chronicles. He also appeared in the film Maverick that same year with Mel Gibson, Jodie Foster, and James Garner.

Screenwriter and novelist
Gordon was also a prolific screenwriter and novelist.  Usually credited as "Leo V. Gordon", he wrote dozens of scripts for television series and movies, sometimes writing a good role for himself. His first successful film script, The Cry Baby Killer, featured a young and unknown Jack Nicholson. Among the more notable feature films he wrote was You Can't Win 'Em All (1970) starring Tony Curtis and Charles Bronson. He also wrote the screenplay and appeared in Tobruk (1967), which starred Rock Hudson and George Peppard and was directed by Arthur Hiller. As a television screenwriter he wrote nearly 50 scripts apiece for Bonanza, Cheyenne and Maverick, in the episodes in which he was not a guest star. In the 1970s he appeared frequently as well on the popular police drama Adam-12, another show that he often scripted. Gordon once told an interviewer that because of his imposing size he never felt he was fully accepted as a screenwriter: "Writing is more rewarding than acting, but look at my face. Nobody believes I’m a writer. I should be 5' 8", 142 pounds, wear patches on my elbows and horn-rimmed glasses and smoke a pipe. That's a writer!" In addition to his script work for films and television Gordon wrote or co-wrote several novels, including the historical Western Powderkeg.

Personal life 
In 1997 Gordon received the Golden Boot Award for his many years working in Westerns.

Gordon died, aged 78, on December 26, 2000. His ashes and those of his wife are together in a memorial display in a columbarium at the Hollywood Forever Cemetery in Los Angeles.

Complete filmography

1950s
China Venture (1953) as Sgt. Hank Janowicz
City of Bad Men (1953) as Russell (uncredited)
Gun Fury (1953) as Tom "Jess" Burgess
All the Brothers Were Valiant (1953) as Peter How
Hondo (1953) as Ed Lowe
Riot in Cell Block 11 (1954) as Crazy Mike Carnie
The Egyptian (1954) as Minor Role (uncredited)
The Yellow Mountain (1954) as Drake
Sign of the Pagan (1954) as Bleda
The Bamboo Prison (1954) as Pike
Ten Wanted Men (1955) as Frank Scavo
Seven Angry Men (1955) as Martin White
Santa Fe Passage (1955) as Tuss McLawery
Soldier of Fortune (1955) as Big Matt
Robbers' Roost (1955) as Jeff
Tennessee's Partner (1955) as The Sheriff
Man with the Gun (1955) as Ed Pinchot
The Conqueror (1956) as Tartar Captain
The Steel Jungle (1956) as Lupo
Red Sundown (1956) as Rod Zellman
The Man Who Knew Too Much (1956) as Chauffeur (uncredited)
Great Day in the Morning (1956) as Zeff Masterson
Johnny Concho (1956) as Mason
7th Cavalry (1956) as Vogel
The Restless Breed (1957) as Cherokee
Lure of the Swamp (1957) as Steggins, Insurance Investigator
Black Patch (1957) as Hank Danner
The Tall Stranger (1957) as Stark
Baby Face Nelson (1957) as John Dillinger
Man in the Shadow (1957) as Chet Huneker
The Notorious Mr. Monks (1958) as Chip Klamp
Quantrill's Raiders (1958) as Quantrill
The Cry Baby Killer (1958) as Man in Crowd (uncredited)
Apache Territory (1958) as Zimmerman
Ride a Crooked Trail (1958) as Sam Mason
Escort West (1958) as Trooper Vogel
The Big Operator (1959) as Danny Sacanzi
The Jayhawkers! (1959) as Jake Barton

1960s
Noose for a Gunman (1960) as Link Roy
The Nun and the Sergeant (1962) as Dockman
The Intruder (1962) as Sam Griffin
Tarzan Goes to India (1962) as Bryce, Head Engineer
The Raven (1963) as Grimes (uncredited voice)
The Haunted Palace (1963) as Edgar Weeden / Ezra Weeden
McLintock! (1963) as Jones
Kings of the Sun (1963) as Hunac Ceel
Kitten with a Whip (1964) as Enders
The Girls on the Beach (1965) as Second Waiter (uncredited)
The Dictator's Guns (1965) as Morrison
The Night of the Grizzly (1966) as Cass Dowdy
Beau Geste (1966) as Krauss
Tobruk (1967) as Sgt. Krug
Devil's Angels (1967) as Sheriff Henderson
The St. Valentine's Day Massacre (1967) as Heitler
Hostile Guns (1967) as Hank Pleasant
Buckskin (1968) as Travis

1970s
You Can't Win 'Em All (1970) as Bolek
The Trackers (1971, TV Movie) as Higgins
Bonnie's Kids (1973) as Charley
My Name Is Nobody (1973) as Red
Nashville Girl (1976) as Burt
The Lucifer Complex (1978) as Norris (uncredited)
Son of Hitler (1978) as Tuennes
Bog (1979) as Dr. John Warren

1980s
Rage! (1980, TV Movie) as Cal's Father
M.A.D.D.: Mothers Against Drunk Drivers (1983, TV Movie) as Officer Horvath
Fire and Ice (1983) as Jarol
The Rousters (1983, TV Movie) as Unhappy Gun Buyer
Savage Dawn (1985) as Sheriff
The All American Cowboy (1985, TV Movie)
The Garbage Pail Kids Movie (1987) as Guard #1
Big Top Pee-wee (1988) as Joe the Blacksmith
Saturday the 14th Strikes Back (1988) as The Evil One
Alienator (1989) as Col. Coburn

1990s
Mob Boss (1990) as Don O'Reily
Maverick (1994) as Poker Player
The Adventures of Young Indiana Jones: Hollywood Follies (1994, TV Movie) as Wyatt Earp (final film role)

Partial television credits
 Official Detective - episode "Muggers" (1958) as Joseph Kirku
 Sea Hunt - episode "Flooded Mine" (1958) as panicky miner
 Bat Masterson - episode "Dude's Folly" (1958) as Joe Quince and episode “Law of the Land (1960) as Red Eric Peterson
 Cheyenne - episode "The Outlander" (1955) as MacDonald
 Gunsmoke - five episodes (1956-1974)
 Broken Arrow – episode "The Raiders" (1956) as Will Carr
 Tales of Wells Fargo - three episodes (1957-1961)
 Maverick - five episodes (1957–1959)
 Walt Disney's Wonderful World of Color - two episodes (1958)
 The Rifleman (1958-1963) - two episodes
 The Walter Winchell File - episode "The Witness" (1957) as Robinson
 Perry Mason - episode "The Case of the Dangerous Dowager" (1959) as Charles Duncan
 Bonanza – 3 episodes (1959-1968) as Early Thorne / Forsythe / Fargo Taylor
 Have Gun - Will Travel as Harkness in S4E16 “The Sanctuary” (1960)
 The Untouchables - two episodes (1960)
 The Andy Griffith Show – episode "High Noon in Mayberry" (1963) as Luke Comstock
 Laredo – episode "Lazyfoot, Where Are You?" (1965) as Moose
 Daniel Boone – episode "A Rope for Mingo" (1965) as Silas Morgan
 Laredo – episode "The Land Slickers" (1966) as Wayne Emerson
 Rango – episode "The Daring Holdup of the Deadwood Stage" (1967) as Slade
 McCloud – episode "Horse Stealing on Fifth Avenue" (1970) as Officer Shannen
 O'Hara, U.S. Treasury – episode "Operation: Hijack" (1971) as Harry Wilson 
 Alias Smith and Jones – episode "Smiler with a Gun" (1971) as Ebenezer 
 Hec Ramsey – episode "The Mystery of Chalk Hill" (1973) as Shaneley
 The F.B.I. – episode "Diamond Run" (1974) as Drunk Driver
 Adam-12 - five episodes (1971-1975)
 Cannon – episode "A Touch of Venom" (1975) as Jack Danvers
 The Rockford Files - four episodes (1978-1979)
 Little House on the Prairie – episode "The King Is Dead" (1979) as Milo Stavroupolis 
 Fantasy Island - two episodes (1980-1981)
 The Winds of War (1983 TV miniseries) as General "Train" Anderson
 Magnum, P.I. – episode "The People vs. Orville Wright" (1987) as Croquet Player
 The Dukes of Hazzard – episode "Deputy Dukes" (1979) as Rocky Marlowe

References

External links

 
 

1922 births
2000 deaths
American male film actors
American male screenwriters
American male television actors
American male novelists
Male actors from New York City
Male actors from Los Angeles
Male Spaghetti Western actors
Male Western (genre) film actors
Civilian Conservation Corps people
Military personnel from New York City
United States Army soldiers
United States Army personnel of World War II
American people convicted of robbery
Burials at Hollywood Forever Cemetery
20th-century American male actors
20th-century American novelists
Western (genre) television actors
20th-century American male writers
Novelists from New York (state)
Screenwriters from New York (state)
Screenwriters from California
20th-century American screenwriters